The West Virginia University Health System, commonly branded as WVU Medicine is a nonprofit health enterprise affiliated with West Virginia University. It provides services throughout West Virginia and portions of the surrounding states of Maryland, Ohio, and Pennsylvania.

Hospitals

The system directly and/or operates a number of hospitals throughout its service territory:

 Flagship J.W. Ruby Memorial Hospital in Morgantown, West Virginia
 WVU Medicine Children’s, co-located on the Morgantown hospital campus
 United Hospital Center in Bridgeport
 Camden Clark Medical Center in Parkersburg
 Berkeley Medical Center in Martinsburg
 Barnesville Hospital in Barnesville, Ohio
 Braxton County Memorial Hospital in Gassaway
 Fairmont Medical Center in Fairmont
 Harrison Community Hospital in Cadiz, Ohio
 Jackson General Hospital in Ripley
 Jefferson Medical Center in Ranson
 Potomac Valley Hospital in Keyser
 Reynolds Memorial Hospital in Glen Dale
 St. Joseph’s Hospital in Buckhannon
 Summersville Regional Medical Center in Summersville
 Uniontown Hospital in Uniontown, Pennsylvania
 Wetzel County Hospital in New Martinsville
 Wheeling Hospital in Wheeling
 Garrett Regional Medical Center in Oakland, Maryland
 Princeton Community Hospital in Princeton

The WVU Health System also includes five institutes:

 WVU Cancer Institute
 WVU Critical Care and Trauma Institute
 WVU Eye Institute
 WVU Heart and Vascular Institute
 WVU Rockefeller Neuroscience Institute

The health system has more than 21,720 employees and 1,843 beds.

Faculty practice
As of July 1, 2021, the faculty practice and WVU School of Medicine has:
 
589 Residents and Fellows
50 ACGME accredited residencies and fellowships
3 CAST accredited fellowships
14 special (non-ACGME) accredited fellowships

This excludes the hospital dentistry programs and the PhD programs.

The faculty practice also operates several clinics across West Virginia, Maryland, Pennsylvania, and Virginia.

General background 
In 1960, West Virginia University opened a tertiary care teaching hospital as a component of the medical center of the University. In 1984, the West Virginia Legislature authorized separation of the hospital operations from the University and the establishment of a separate corporate entity. West Virginia University Hospitals, Inc. was incorporated as a non-stock, not-for-profit corporation and, by an agreement of transfer and lease dated July 1, 1984, assumed the operation of and responsibility for the hospital. The existing, 690-bed hospital serves as a major statewide and regional health care referral center, and provides the principal clinical education and research site for West Virginia University.

The hospital's original facility, constructed in 1960, is now the WVU Health Sciences Building and serves as the central academic teaching facility for WVU. Ownership of this facility resides with the State of West Virginia.  In 1986, West Virginia University Hospitals, Inc. began construction of its current facility, J.W. Ruby Memorial Hospital, a 10-story,  facility that began operating in 1988.  The J.W. Ruby Memorial Hospital is a tertiary care referral center and serves as the principal clinical education and research site for the WVU School of Medicine. As part of its 690-bed complement and within its existing contiguous facility, the Hospital operates a 119-bed Children's Hospital. However, in November 2017, the leadership of WVU Medicine announced plans to build a 10-story, 150-bed Children's Hospital on the main medical campus in Morgantown.

The broader health system, now known as the West Virginia University Health System, formed in 1996 with J.W. Ruby Memorial Hospital and United Hospital Center as the original two hospital members. Since then, the health system has grown mostly through acquisitions or clinical affiliation agreements. West Virginia University Health System, which operates under the brand "WVU Medicine", has since become West Virginia's largest employer and healthcare provider. Collectively, WVU Medicine operates in all but 14 of West Virginia's 55 counties, and has clinics in Virginia, Pennsylvania, Maryland, and Ohio.

References

External links
 

Hospital networks in the United States
Healthcare in West Virginia
West Virginia University
Medical and health organizations based in West Virginia